Muhammad Rian Ardianto (born 13 February 1996) is an Indonesian badminton player. Born in Bantul, Yogyakarta SR, Ardianto plays for the Jaya Raya Jakarta club at national events. He won the men's doubles silver medal at the 2018 Asian Games, the bronze medals at the 2019 World Championships and at the 2017 Southeast Asian Games. Ardianto was part of Indonesia winning team at the 2020 Thomas Cup.

Career 
In the junior events, Ardianto has collected two silvers and a bronze at the World Junior Championships, and also a bronze medal at the Asian Junior Championships. Partnering Fajar Alfian in the men's doubles event, they have won some international tournaments including the Indonesia International in 2014, 2015, and 2016; the Austrian International in 2015; and at the BWF Grand Prix level, the 2016 Chinese Taipei Masters.

Ardianto was a member of the Indonesia men's team that won gold medals at the 2017 and 2019 Southeast Asian Games. He also played with Alfian, and clinched the men's doubles bronze at that event in 2017. In 2018, Ardianto and Alfian competed on the BWF World Tour, and won titles at the Malaysia Masters and the Syed Modi International, and at the 2019 Swiss and Korea Opens. The duo were a silver medalists at the 2018 Asian Games, and bronze medalists at the 2019 BWF World Championships.

In February 2020, Ardianto alongside Indonesia men's team won the Asia Team Championships held in Manila. In September–October 2021, Ardianto alongside Indonesia team competed at the 2021 Sudirman Cup in Vantaa, Finland. He and Alfian contribute a point in a tie against Canada. Indonesia team advanced to the knocked-out stage, but stopped in the quarter-finals to Malaysia. In the next tournament, he helped Indonesia team won the World Men's Team Championships, the 2020 Thomas Cup.

In the first half of 2022, the Ardianto and Alfian partnership have won three titles of seven finals that they reached. The duo won the Swiss Open, Indonesia and Malaysia Masters, and finished runners-up  at the Korea, Thailand, Malaysia and Singapore Opens. They also won bronze medal at the Asian Championships. In October, they won their fourth title of the year at the Denmark Open. In the final week of 2022, they reach career high of world number 1.

2023 
In January, the Ardianto and Alfian partnership won their first Super 1000 tournament at the Malaysia Open by defeating Chinese pair Liang Weikeng and Wang Chang. In the following week, as the last man stand, they were defeated in the semi-finals of India Open by 3rd seed Malaysian pair Aaron Chia and Soh Wooi Yik, and made Indonesia going home empty handed. They competed in the home tournament, Indonesia Masters, but unfortunately lost in the quarter-finals from 5th seed Chinese pair Liu Yuchen and Ou Xuanyi.

In February, Ardianto join the Indonesia national badminton team to compete at the Badminton Asia Mixed Team Championships, but unfortunately the teams lost in the quarter-finals from team Korea.

With the Indonesian federation skipping the German Open, Ardianto and Alfian resumed competition at the All England in March. They won their first ever All England title in an all-Indonesian final against Mohammad Ahsan and Hendra Setiawan.

Awards and nominations

Achievements

BWF World Championships 
Men's doubles

Asian Games 
Men's doubles

Asian Championships 
Men's doubles

Southeast Asian Games 
Men's doubles

BWF World Junior Championships 
Boys' doubles

Mixed doubles

Asian Junior Championships 
Mixed doubles

BWF World Tour (10 titles, 5 runners-up) 
The BWF World Tour, which was announced on 19 March 2017 and implemented in 2018, is a series of elite badminton tournaments sanctioned by the Badminton World Federation (BWF). The BWF World Tour is divided into levels of World Tour Finals, Super 1000, Super 750, Super 500, Super 300, and the BWF Tour Super 100.

Men's doubles

BWF Grand Prix (1 title, 2 runners-up) 
The BWF Grand Prix had two levels, the Grand Prix and Grand Prix Gold. It was a series of badminton tournaments sanctioned by the Badminton World Federation (BWF) and played between 2007 and 2017.

Men's doubles

  BWF Grand Prix Gold tournament
  BWF Grand Prix tournament

BWF International Challenge/Series (4 titles) 
Men's doubles

  BWF International Challenge tournament
  BWF International Series tournament

BWF Junior International (1 runner-up) 
Boys' doubles

  BWF Junior International Grand Prix tournament
  BWF Junior International Challenge tournament
  BWF Junior International Series tournament
  BWF Junior Future Series tournament

Performance timeline

National team 
 Junior level

 Senior level

Individual competitions

Junior level

Boys' doubles

Mixed doubles

Senior level

Men's doubles

Mixed doubles

Record against selected opponents 
Men's doubles results with Fajar Alfian against year-end Finals finalists, World Championships semi-finalists, and Olympic quarter-finalists, accurate as of 11 December 2022.

References 

1996 births
Living people
People from Bantul Regency
Sportspeople from Special Region of Yogyakarta
Indonesian male badminton players
Badminton players at the 2018 Asian Games
Asian Games silver medalists for Indonesia
Asian Games medalists in badminton
Medalists at the 2018 Asian Games
Competitors at the 2017 Southeast Asian Games
Competitors at the 2019 Southeast Asian Games
Southeast Asian Games gold medalists for Indonesia
Southeast Asian Games bronze medalists for Indonesia
Southeast Asian Games medalists in badminton
21st-century Indonesian people